Presidential Palace Historical Site (Vietnamese: Khu di tích Phủ Chủ tịch), which is located in Hanoi, Vietnam, is the place where Ho Chi Minh lived and worked in most of his revolutionary life (from December 19, 1954, to September 2, 1969). This site was listed by the Ministry of Culture and Information of Vietnam in 1975.

See also
Presidential Palace
Ho Chi Minh Mausoleum
Ho Chi Minh Museum

Historical sites in Hanoi
Governmental office in Hanoi
Presidents of Vietnam